Rosie Banks may refer to 

Rosie Banks, from list of Brookside characters played by Susan Twist 1994–1996
Rosie M. Banks, fictional romance novelist character in the Jeeves and Drones Club stories of P. G. Wodehouse
Rosie Banks, pseudonymous author for the Secret Princesses series of children's books by Orchard Books, part of Hachette